The University of Miami Rugby Football Club is the rugby union club of the University of Miami in Coral Gables, Florida. 
The coach is Ryan Forston. 
The University of Miami Rugby team competes in the USA Rugby South against other rugby clubs in Florida and has played teams outside of Florida, including in the Bahamas and in other Caribbean nations.

History
The club was formally founded in 1989 as the Miami Rugby Club for students of the University of Miami, though the team existed prior to 1989 as an intramural sport at the University of Miami competing against local clubs from 1978 to 1994.

Players
The Hurricanes are made up of students of the University, though players from other countries occasionally have played for the Club while enrolled as students at the University of Miami. The team relies primarily on talent from within the United States, many of whom did not compete in rugby prior to college. Despite this, the program regularly produces Collegiate Select Side players for the Florida Rugby Union and several players have been invited to the USA Rugby South selection camp. The players within the club come from all over the United States, and some have competed previously in other rugby unions. Several players have played for professional clubs on a part-time or full-time basis, including for the San Francisco Golden Gate Rugby Football Club and the Chicago Griffins. The team competed in the Battleship Tournament, a national tournament, finishing second to Louisiana State University.

Club honors
 Florida Rugby Union, Florida Cup Semi-finalists in 2010
 Battleship Tournament, Runner-up in 2010
 Florida Rugby Union,  Florida Cup Semi-finalists in 2008
 Florida Rugby Union Florida Cup Runner-up in 1995

Philanthropy

The University of Miami Rugby team is actively involved philanthropically in the Miami metropolitan area community, including:

Volunteering at Hard Rock Stadium during Miami Hurricanes football home games;
Working every year at a local Renaissance Festival; and
Co-participating with the University of Miami Women's Rugby Team] in Relay for Life.

References

External links 
 

 
College sports teams in Florida
Rugby union teams in Miami
1989 establishments in Florida
Rugby clubs established in 1989